This is a list of the 646 previous constituencies of the United Kingdom parliament.

There are 650 in the 2010 election constituencies currently represented in the House of Commons of the Parliament of the United Kingdom, as at the 2005 general election. Each constituency is represented by a single Member of Parliament (MP).

Constituency boundaries are subject to regular review by the four independent Boundary Commissions, usually once every 10 to 15 years, to keep the electorate of each constituency as close to the national average as is reasonably possible. New constituencies may be created, or existing ones abolished, by these reviews. For the list of recommended constituencies following the current review see Constituencies in the next United Kingdom general election.

Constituencies were long based on boroughs (burghs in Scotland) and counties. Today, constituencies in England are mostly subdivisions of local authorities, with each constituency comprising a number of whole wards. In Scotland, constituencies are subdivisions of council areas, and in Wales they are subdivisions of the preserved counties. Northern Ireland is reviewed as a whole, and constituency boundaries may cross all district borders.

In some cases, particularly in urban areas, two or more local government areas may be combined to form a single review area, so that particularly large or small constituencies are not created. For example, if two adjacent areas are entitled to 1.5 constituencies each, they may be combined and awarded three constituencies, rather than having two constituencies each, all of which would be well below the average constituency electorate.

The average constituency size is approximately 74,000 registered voters, but they vary in size from the smallest (Na h-Eileanan an Iar at 22,200 voters) to the largest (the Isle of Wight at approximately 110,000 voters). A constituency has no physical size restrictions.

The Parliament of 2001 contained representatives from 659 constituencies. Most of the current constituency boundaries were last reviewed in the early 1990s, and are therefore based on administrative boundaries prior to the last series of local government boundary changes. However, a Boundary Commission for Scotland review in February 2005 resulted in the reorganisation of most Scottish constituencies to adjust for the historic over-representation of Scotland. This reduced the number of constituencies in Scotland by 13, from 72 down to the current 59. The Parliament of 2005 therefore had 646 representatives. In the 2010 Election on 6 May 2010 the number of seats contested has increased from 646 to 650 as a result of boundary changes. Technically an absolute majority would require one party to win 326 seats, or else there would be a hung parliament.



England

East Midlands

Derbyshire

 Amber Valley
 Bolsover
 Chesterfield
 Derby North
 Derby South
 Erewash
 High Peak
 North East Derbyshire
 South Derbyshire
 West Derbyshire

Leicestershire

 Blaby
 Bosworth
 Charnwood
 Harborough
 Leicester East
 Leicester South
 Leicester West
 Loughborough
 North West Leicestershire
 Rutland and Melton

Lincolnshire

 Boston and Skegness
 Gainsborough
 Grantham and Stamford
 Lincoln
 Louth and Horncastle
 Sleaford and North Hykeham
 South Holland and The Deepings

Northamptonshire

 Corby
 Daventry
 Kettering
 Northampton North
 Northampton South
 Wellingborough

Nottinghamshire

 Ashfield
 Bassetlaw
 Broxtowe
 Gedling
 Mansfield
 Newark
 Nottingham East
 Nottingham North
 Nottingham South
 Rushcliffe
 Sherwood

East of England

Bedfordshire

 Bedford
 Luton North
 Luton South
 Mid Bedfordshire
 North East Bedfordshire
 South West Bedfordshire

Cambridgeshire

 Cambridge
 Huntingdon
 North East Cambridgeshire
 North West Cambridgeshire
 Peterborough
 South Cambridgeshire
 South East Cambridgeshire

Essex

 Basildon
 Billericay
 Braintree
 Brentwood and Ongar
 Castle Point
 Colchester
 Epping Forest
 Harlow
 Harwich
 Maldon and East Chelmsford
 North Essex
 Rayleigh
 Rochford and Southend East
 Saffron Walden
 Southend West
 Thurrock
 West Chelmsford

Hertfordshire

 Broxbourne
 Hemel Hempstead
 Hertford and Stortford
 Hertsmere
 Hitchin and Harpenden
 North East Hertfordshire
 St Albans
 South West Hertfordshire
 Stevenage
 Watford
 Welwyn Hatfield

Norfolk

 Great Yarmouth
 Mid Norfolk
 North Norfolk
 North West Norfolk
 Norwich North
 Norwich South
 South Norfolk
 South West Norfolk

Suffolk

 Bury St Edmunds
 Central Suffolk and North Ipswich
 Ipswich
 South Suffolk
 Suffolk Coastal
 Waveney
 West Suffolk

Greater London

North East London Boroughs
 Barking
 Bethnal Green and Bow
 Chingford and Woodford Green
 Dagenham
 East Ham
 Edmonton
 Enfield North
 Enfield Southgate
 Hackney North and Stoke Newington
 Hackney South and Shoreditch
 Hornchurch
 Hornsey and Wood Green
 Ilford North
 Ilford South
 Islington North
 Islington South and Finsbury
 Leyton and Wanstead
 Poplar and Canning Town
 Romford
 Tottenham
 Upminster
 Walthamstow
 West Ham

North West London Boroughs
 Brent East
 Brent North
 Brent South
 Chipping Barnet
 Cities of London and Westminster
 Ealing, Acton and Shepherd's Bush
 Ealing North
 Ealing Southall
 Finchley and Golders Green
 Hammersmith and Fulham
 Hampstead and Highgate
 Harrow East
 Harrow West
 Hayes and Harlington
 Hendon
 Holborn and St. Pancras
 Kensington and Chelsea
 Regent's Park and Kensington North
 Ruislip-Northwood
 Uxbridge

South East London Boroughs
 Beckenham
 Bexleyheath and Crayford
 Bromley and Chislehurst
 Camberwell and Peckham
 Croydon Central
 Croydon North
 Croydon South
 Dulwich and West Norwood
 Eltham
 Erith and Thamesmead
 Greenwich and Woolwich
 Lewisham Deptford
 Lewisham East
 Lewisham West
 North Southwark and Bermondsey
 Old Bexley and Sidcup

South West London Boroughs
 Battersea
 Brentford and Isleworth
 Carshalton and Wallington
 Feltham and Heston
 Kingston and Surbiton
 Mitcham and Morden
 Putney
 Richmond Park
 Streatham
 Sutton and Cheam
 Tooting
 Twickenham
 Vauxhall
 Wimbledon
 Wandsworth

North East England

Cleveland

 Hartlepool
 Middlesbrough
 Middlesbrough South and East Cleveland
 Redcar
 Stockton North
 Stockton South

Durham

 Bishop Auckland
 City of Durham
 Darlington
 Easington
 North Durham
 North West Durham
 Sedgefield

Northumberland

 Berwick-upon-Tweed
 Blyth Valley
 Hexham
 Wansbeck

Tyne and Wear

 Blaydon
 Gateshead East and Washington West
 Houghton and Washington East
 Jarrow
 Newcastle upon Tyne Central
 Newcastle upon Tyne East and Wallsend
 Newcastle upon Tyne North
 North Tyneside
 South Shields
 Sunderland North
 Sunderland South
 Tyne Bridge
 Tynemouth

North West England

Cheshire

 City of Chester
 Congleton
 Crewe and Nantwich
 Eddisbury
 Ellesmere Port and Neston
 Halton
 Macclesfield
 Tatton
 Warrington North
 Warrington South
 Weaver Vale

Cumbria

 Barrow and Furness
 Carlisle
 Copeland
 Penrith and The Border
 Westmorland and Lonsdale
 Workington

Greater Manchester

 Altrincham and Sale West
 Ashton-under-Lyne
 Bolton North East
 Bolton South East
 Bolton West
 Bury North
 Bury South
 Cheadle
 Denton and Reddish
 Eccles
 Hazel Grove
 Heywood and Middleton
 Leigh
 Makerfield
 Manchester Blackley
 Manchester Central
 Manchester Gorton
 Manchester Withington
 Oldham East and Saddleworth
 Oldham West and Royton
 Rochdale
 Salford
 Stalybridge and Hyde
 Stockport
 Stretford and Urmston
 Wigan
 Worsley
 Wythenshawe and Sale East

Lancashire

 Blackburn
 Blackpool North and Fleetwood
 Blackpool South
 Burnley
 Chorley
 Fylde
 Hyndburn
 Lancaster and Wyre
 Morecambe and Lunesdale
 Pendle
 Preston
 Ribble Valley
 Rossendale and Darwen
 South Ribble
 West Lancashire

Merseyside

 Birkenhead
 Bootle
 Crosby
 Knowsley North and Sefton East
 Knowsley South
 Liverpool Garston
 Liverpool Riverside
 Liverpool Walton
 Liverpool Wavertree
 Liverpool West Derby
 St Helens North
 St Helens South
 Southport
 Wallasey
 Wirral South
 Wirral West

South East England

Berkshire

 Bracknell
 Maidenhead
 Newbury
 Reading East
 Reading West
 Slough
 Windsor
 Wokingham

Buckinghamshire

 Aylesbury
 Beaconsfield
 Buckingham
 Chesham and Amersham
 Milton Keynes South West
 North East Milton Keynes 
 Wycombe

East Sussex

 Bexhill and Battle
 Brighton Kemptown
 Brighton Pavilion
 Eastbourne
 Hastings and Rye
 Hove
 Lewes
 Wealden

Hampshire

 Aldershot
 Basingstoke
 East Hampshire
 Eastleigh
 Fareham
 Gosport
 Havant
 New Forest East
 New Forest West
 North East Hampshire
 North West Hampshire
 Portsmouth North
 Portsmouth South
 Romsey
 Southampton Itchen
 Southampton Test
 Winchester

Isle of Wight
 Isle of Wight

Kent

 Ashford
 Canterbury
 Chatham and Aylesford
 Dartford
 Dover
 Faversham and Mid Kent
 Folkestone and Hythe
 Gillingham
 Gravesham
 Maidstone and The Weald
 Medway
 North Thanet
 Orpington
 Sevenoaks
 Sittingbourne and Sheppey
 South Thanet
 Tonbridge and Malling
 Tunbridge Wells

Oxfordshire

 Banbury
 Henley
 Oxford East
 Oxford West and Abingdon
 Wantage
 Witney

Surrey

 East Surrey
 Epsom and Ewell
 Esher and Walton
 Guildford
 Mole Valley
 Reigate
 Runnymede and Weybridge
 South West Surrey
 Spelthorne
 Surrey Heath
 Woking

West Sussex

 Arundel and South Downs
 Bognor Regis and Littlehampton
 Chichester
 Crawley
 East Worthing and Shoreham
 Horsham
 Mid Sussex
 Worthing West

South West England

Avon

 Bath
 Bristol East
 Bristol North West
 Bristol South
 Bristol West
 Kingswood
 Northavon
 Wansdyke
 Weston-Super-Mare
 Woodspring

Cornwall

 Falmouth and Camborne
 North Cornwall
 St Ives
 South East Cornwall
 Truro and St Austell

Devon

 East Devon
 Exeter
 North Devon
 Plymouth Devonport
 Plymouth Sutton
 South West Devon
 Teignbridge
 Tiverton and Honiton
 Torbay
 Torridge and West Devon
 Totnes

Dorset

 Bournemouth East
 Bournemouth West
 Christchurch
 Mid Dorset and North Poole
 North Dorset
 Poole
 South Dorset
 West Dorset

Gloucestershire

 Cheltenham
 Cotswold
 Forest of Dean
 Gloucester
 Stroud
 Tewkesbury

Somerset

 Bridgwater
 Somerton and Frome
 Taunton
 Wells
 Yeovil

Wiltshire

 Devizes
 North Swindon
 North Wiltshire
 Salisbury
 South Swindon
 Westbury

West Midlands

Hereford and Worcester

 Bromsgrove
 Hereford
 Leominster
 Mid Worcestershire
 Redditch
 West Worcestershire
 Worcester
 Wyre Forest

Shropshire

 Ludlow
 North Shropshire
 Shrewsbury and Atcham
 Telford
 The Wrekin

Staffordshire

 Burton
 Cannock Chase
 Lichfield
 Newcastle-under-Lyme
 South Staffordshire
 Stafford
 Staffordshire Moorlands
 Stoke-on-Trent Central
 Stoke-on-Trent North
 Stoke-on-Trent South
 Stone
 Tamworth

Warwickshire

 North Warwickshire
 Nuneaton
 Rugby and Kenilworth
 Stratford-on-Avon
 Warwick and Leamington

West Midlands (county)

 Aldridge-Brownhills
 Birmingham Edgbaston
 Birmingham Erdington
 Birmingham Hall Green
 Birmingham Hodge Hill
 Birmingham Ladywood
 Birmingham Northfield
 Birmingham Perry Barr
 Birmingham Selly Oak
 Birmingham Sparkbrook and Small Heath
 Birmingham Yardley
 Coventry North East
 Coventry North West
 Coventry South
 Dudley North
 Dudley South
 Halesowen and Rowley Regis
 Meriden
 Solihull
 Stourbridge
 Sutton Coldfield
 Walsall North
 Walsall South
 Warley
 West Bromwich East
 West Bromwich West
 Wolverhampton North East
 Wolverhampton South East
 Wolverhampton South West

Yorkshire and the Humber

Humberside

 Beverley and Holderness
 Brigg and Goole
 Cleethorpes
 East Yorkshire
 Great Grimsby
 Haltemprice and Howden
 Kingston upon Hull East
 Kingston upon Hull North
 Kingston upon Hull West and Hessle
 Scunthorpe

North Yorkshire

 City of York
 Harrogate and Knaresborough
 Richmond (Yorks)
 Ryedale
 Scarborough and Whitby
 Selby
 Skipton and Ripon
 Vale of York

South Yorkshire

 Barnsley Central
 Barnsley East and Mexborough
 Barnsley West and Penistone
 Don Valley
 Doncaster Central
 Doncaster North
 Rother Valley
 Rotherham
 Sheffield Attercliffe
 Sheffield Brightside
 Sheffield Central
 Sheffield Hallam
 Sheffield Heeley
 Sheffield Hillsborough
 Wentworth

West Yorkshire

 Batley and Spen
 Bradford North
 Bradford South
 Bradford West
 Calder Valley
 Colne Valley
 Dewsbury
 Elmet
 Halifax
 Hemsworth
 Huddersfield
 Keighley
 Leeds Central
 Leeds East
 Leeds North East
 Leeds North West
 Leeds West
 Morley and Rothwell
 Normanton
 Pontefract and Castleford
 Pudsey
 Shipley
 Wakefield

Northern Ireland

 Belfast East
 Belfast North
 Belfast South
 Belfast West
 East Antrim
 East Londonderry
 Fermanagh & South Tyrone
 Foyle
 Lagan Valley
 Mid Ulster
 Newry & Armagh
 North Antrim
 North Down
 South Antrim
 South Down
 Strangford
 Upper Bann
 West Tyrone

Scotland

The Fifth Periodical Review of the Boundary Commission for Scotland related the boundaries of new constituencies to those of Scottish local government council areas and to local government wards. Apart from a few minor adjustments, the council area boundaries dated from 1996 and the ward boundaries dated from 1999. Some council areas were grouped to form larger areas and, within these larger areas, some constituencies straddle council area boundaries.

Dumfries and Galloway, Scottish Borders

 Dumfries and Galloway
 Dumfriesshire, Clydesdale and Tweeddale
 Berwickshire, Roxburgh and Selkirk

South Ayrshire, East Ayrshire, North Ayrshire

 Central Ayrshire
 Ayr, Carrick and Cumnock
 Kilmarnock and Loudoun
 North Ayrshire and Arran

North Lanarkshire, South Lanarkshire

 East Kilbride, Strathaven and Lesmahagow
 Lanark and Hamilton East
 Rutherglen and Hamilton West
 Coatbridge, Chryston and Bellshill
 Cumbernauld, Kilsyth and Kirkintilloch East
 Airdrie and Shotts
 Motherwell and Wishaw

East Lothian, Midlothian

 East Lothian
 Midlothian

City of Edinburgh

 Edinburgh East
 Edinburgh North and Leith
 Edinburgh South
 Edinburgh South West
 Edinburgh West

West Lothian, Falkirk

 Linlithgow and East Falkirk
 Livingston
 Falkirk

West Dunbartonshire, East Dunbartonshire

 West Dunbartonshire
 East Dunbartonshire

Renfrewshire, East Renfrewshire, Inverclyde

 Paisley and Renfrewshire North
 Paisley and Renfrewshire South
 East Renfrewshire
 Inverclyde

Glasgow City

 Glasgow Central
 Glasgow East
 Glasgow North
 Glasgow North East
 Glasgow North West
 Glasgow South
 Glasgow South West

Stirling, Clackmannanshire, Perth and Kinross

 Ochil and South Perthshire
 Perth and North Perthshire
 Stirling

Fife

 Glenrothes
 Kirkcaldy and Cowdenbeath
 Dunfermline and West Fife
 North East Fife

Angus, Dundee City

 Dundee East
 Dundee West
 Angus

Aberdeenshire, City of Aberdeen

 Gordon
 West Aberdeenshire and Kincardine
 Banff and Buchan
 Aberdeen North
 Aberdeen South

Moray, Argyll and Bute, Highlands

 Argyll and Bute
 Moray
 Caithness, Sutherland and Easter Ross
 Inverness, Nairn, Badenoch and Strathspey
 Ross, Skye and Lochaber

The Outer Hebrides, Orkney, Shetland

 Na h-Eileanan an Iar
 Orkney and Shetland

Wales
 Aberavon
 Aberconwy
 Arfon
 Alyn and Deeside
 Blaenau Gwent
 Brecon and Radnorshire
 Bridgend
 Caerphilly
 Cardiff Central
 Cardiff North
 Cardiff South and Penarth
 Cardiff West
 Carmarthen East and Dinefwr
 Carmarthen West and South Pembrokeshire
 Ceredigion
 Clwyd South
 Clwyd West
 Cynon Valley
 Delyn
 Dwyfor Meirionnydd
 Gower
 Islwyn
 Llanelli
 Merthyr Tydfil and Rhymney
 Monmouth
 Montgomeryshire
 Neath
 Newport East
 Newport West
 Ogmore
 Pontypridd
 Preseli Pembrokeshire
 Rhondda
 Swansea East
 Swansea West
 Torfaen
 Vale of Clwyd
 Vale of Glamorgan
 Wrexham
 Ynys Môn (formerly Anglesey)

See also
For constituencies prior to 1997 List of former United Kingdom Parliament constituencies
For constituencies following the 2005 general election Constituencies in the next United Kingdom general election

External links
 
ONS List of Constituencies (CSV file)
TheyWorkForYou.com

2005
Parliamentary constituencies
Parliamentary constituencies in England

ar:قائمة الدوائر الانتخابية في المملكة المتحدة
de:Liste der Wahlkreise im Vereinigten Königreich 2005
pt:Anexo:Lista de distritos eleitorais do Reino Unido
simple:List of Parliamentary constituencies in the United Kingdom